Shamlaji fair is an annual festival held in Gujarat, India. It is held on the day of Karthiki Purnima. The fair is attended by a large number of tribals, who have great faith in Shamlaji (Baliya Bawji). People from different regions of Gujarat as well as the state of Rajasthan also come to this fair.

Place
The fair is held at the ancient shrine Shamlaji on the banks of Meshwo river in Sabarkantha district.

Time
Shamlaji fair is held from Devuthi Agiyaras to Purnima, which is the longest running fair in Gujarat.

History
The history of when and who built the temple of Shamlaji is not available, but based on the remains found in the area around Shamlaji, according to the Archaeological Department, the temple is estimated to have been built in the period of 500 A.D to 700 A.D.

There are three legends behind the construction of shrine Shamlaji:

(1) According to one legend, once Brahma came to Shamlaji in search of the best pilgrimage on earth and stopped there, he started penance and Yajna (sacrifice). As a result Lord Vishnu appeared in the form of Shamlaji and established himself there.

(2) According to another legend, Vishwakarma, the architect of the gods, built this temple in one night, and

(3) According to the third legend, an idol of Shamlaji was found here by a tribal farmer while farming. A temple was built there by Vaishnava devotees.

significance

Apart from Brahmins, Vaniyas, Rajputs and Patidars, devotees from Rajasthan and Madhya Pradesh also come to Shamlaji to visit and enjoy the fair. More than two lakh people are expected to attend the fair. Bhuvas-sadhus(priests) also seem to come in large numbers to perform mantra-tantra in this fair.

Among the many people who come with colorful clothes from distant places in fair, mainly the people of the ‘Garasiya’ community are especially prominent. Apart from Krishna, worship of Lord Vishnu is also important at Shamlaji.

In the fair of Shamlaji, the tribal people are seen adorning their traditional dress and ornaments and singing songs. A very popular folk song regarding the fair: Shamlajina  Mele Re, Ranzaniyu vage!

Young men and women tend to meet the spouse they believe in. From the fair people buy silver Jewellery like Vadela, Kankul, Madaliya, Hathwala, Ambalo Jawalan, Ramja or anklet(Zanzar) etc. Tribal women are very fond of tattoos. They tattoo at the fair.

Christians and Muslims also run their own shops in this fair.

There are also inns for the people who come to the fair to stay.

References

External links 
 Aravalli district official website

Aravalli district
Festivals in Gujarat